Nikadjekraj (Neveristheend) is the fourth studio album by the Serbian alternative rock band Veliki Prezir, released by B92 in 2009. The album was elected as the best domestic album in 2009 according to the critics of the webzine Popboks.

Track listing
All lyrics and music written by Vladimir Kolarić, except track 1 and 4, music written by Veliki Prezir, and track 2, music by Boris Mladenović and Vladimir Kolarić.

Personnel

Veliki Prezir
 Vladimir Kolarić — vocals, guitar, electric piano, bass, tambourine, harmonica
 Robert Telčer — guitar, backing vocals, synthesizer [moog]
 Boris Mladenović — bass, synthesizer, vocals, drums, mixed by [tracks: 3, 8], producer, recorded by
 Robert Radić — drums

Additional personnel
 Jovana Tokić — artwork by [design]
 Ken Stringfellow — electric piano, percussion [electric], synthesizer, vocals [tracks: 1, 4, 5, 7, 10, 11]
 Igor Bulatović — mastered by, engineer [post-production]
 Milan Prokop — mastered by, engineer [post-production]
 Saša Janković — mastered by, engineer [post-production], mixed by [tracks: 1, 2, 4 to 11], producer
 Dušan Ševarlić — recorded by, bass [track 8]
 Goran Crevar — recorded by
 Janko Maraš — recorded by
 Feđa Frenklin — percussion [track 1]
 Dušan Kuzmanović — drums [track 3]

References

External links
 Nikadjekraj at Discogs

2009 albums
Veliki Prezir albums
Alternative rock albums by Serbian artists